Menucihr Mosque is a mosque in the medieval city of Ani in Kars Province, Turkey. It was built between 1072 and 1086 by Ebu’l Manuçehr Bey of the Kurdish Shaddadid dynasty. Restoration of the mosque started in june 2020.

See also 
 Spread of Islam among Kurds
Seljuk architecture

References 

Mosques in Turkey
Religious buildings and structures completed in 1086
Shaddadids
Buildings and structures in Kars Province
11th-century mosques
Seljuk architecture